Old man's beard may refer to the following species:

 Chionanthus virginicus, a tree, which is used like a medicinal plant and ornamental plant.
 Clematis aristata, an Australian climbing plant.
 Clematis vitalba, a climbing plant.
 Tillandsia usneoides, "Spanish moss" - a bromeliad.
 Usnea, a type of lichen.